Sergio Fabián Vázquez (born 23 November 1965 in Buenos Aires) is a retired Argentine footballer and a current football manager

Playing career
Vázquez played as a defender for a selection of club teams in Argentina and Chile.

He began his career at Ferro Carril Oeste in 1985, he left the club in 1991 and had short spells playing for Racing Club and Rosario Central before moving to Universidad Católica in Chile. In 1996, he returned to Argentina to play a single season for Banfield and in 1997 he moved to Avispa Fukuoka in the J1 League before he retired from playing.

Vázquez was selected for the Argentina squad for the 1994 FIFA World Cup.

Managerial career
In 2005 Vázquez became manager of 4th division club Villa Dálmine but his reign at the club lasted less than a year.

On December 16, 2006 Vázquez was announced as the new manager of 3rd division side Club Deportivo Armenio but his reign as manager didn't last long as he was replaced only five games into the Clausura 2007 season.

Career statistics

Club

International

Honours

Club
 Universidad Católica
 Copa Interamericana: 1994
 Copa Chile: 1995

International
 Argentina
 Copa América: 1991
 FIFA Confederations Cup: 1992
 Artemio Franchi Trophy: 1993
 Copa América: 1993

References

External links

Living people
1965 births
Argentine footballers
Argentine expatriate footballers
Argentine football managers
Argentine expatriate sportspeople in Japan
Ferro Carril Oeste footballers
Racing Club de Avellaneda footballers
Rosario Central footballers
Club Atlético Banfield footballers
Avispa Fukuoka players
J1 League players
Expatriate footballers in Japan
Footballers from Buenos Aires
1991 Copa América players
1992 King Fahd Cup players
1993 Copa América players
1994 FIFA World Cup players
Copa América-winning players
FIFA Confederations Cup-winning players
Argentina international footballers
Argentine Primera División players
Chilean Primera División players
Expatriate footballers in Chile
Association football defenders